In Italy, a technocratic government, technical government or government of technicians, is the term used to refer to a cabinet made up of experts not officially affiliated to any political party or political coalition. Technocracy in Italy, as elsewhere, has often proved to be controversial. These governments tend to be formed during emergencies, usually an economic crisis, and are seen by some as undemocratic. There have been two such governments in the history of Italy: the Dini Cabinet, and the Monti Cabinet.

Context 

In a technocratic government all major decisions are not made by elected politicians, and the government policy is not decided by party leaders.

The Constitution of Italy doesn't prevent non-members of parliament from obtaining the title of prime minister, as it simply states that the prime minister is appointed by the president and must win a confidence vote in both houses of parliament within ten days of said appointment.

In some cases, in the aftermath of political turmoil, multiple parties in parliament (who together were able to make up a majority) agreed to support a neutral cabinet of experts headed by an independent prime minister, voting in favor of the confidence votes requested by the government, in something similar to a confidence and supply agreement. Said cabinet of experts would have been tasked to deal with the crises and emergencies at play, until a new election could be held.

 

There have been two "government of experts" in the history of Italy: the Dini Cabinet, and the Monti Cabinet. Some cabinets, like the Ciampi Cabinet (1993-1994), the first cabinet chaired by a non-member of parliament, were called "technocratic cabinets" or "cabinets of experts", even though they included politicians in their makeup.

Bibliography

See also 

 Caretaker government
 Ciampi Cabinet
 Dini Cabinet
 Expert State (it)
 Government of National Unity (it)
 Grand coalition
 Monti Cabinet
 Technocracy

References

External links 
 Definizione di "governo ponte" on treccani.it

Government of Italy